Rennes Métropole is the métropole, an intercommunal structure, centred on the city of Rennes. It is located in the Ille-et-Vilaine department, in the Brittany region, western France. It was created in January 2015, replacing the previous Communauté d'agglomération de Rennes, which had itself succeeded in 2000 to the previous district created in 1970 with less powers than the current métropole. Its area is 705.0 km2. Its population was 451,762 in 2018, of which 217,728 in Rennes proper.

The goal of the Métropoles (intercommunal structure for the largest French cities like Lille, Lyon, Bordeaux or Strasbourg) is to build a better metropolitan area by synchronizing the transport system, environmental actions, urbanization, economic and social development, culture, university research, etc.

Participants 

The métropole comprises the following 43 communes:

Acigné
Bécherel
Betton
Bourgbarré
Brécé
Bruz
Cesson-Sévigné
Chantepie
La Chapelle-Chaussée
La Chapelle-des-Fougeretz
La Chapelle-Thouarault
Chartres-de-Bretagne
Chavagne
Chevaigné
Cintré
Clayes
Corps-Nuds
Gévezé
L'Hermitage
Laillé
Langan
Miniac-sous-Bécherel
Montgermont
Mordelles
Nouvoitou
Noyal-Châtillon-sur-Seiche
Orgères, Ille-et-Vilaine
Pacé
Parthenay-de-Bretagne
Pont-Péan
 Rennes (seat)
Le Rheu
Romillé
Saint-Armel
Saint-Erblon
Saint-Gilles
Saint-Grégoire
Saint-Jacques-de-la-Lande
Saint-Sulpice-la-Forêt
Thorigné-Fouillard
Le Verger
Vern-sur-Seiche
Vezin-le-Coquet

Metropolitan Rennes (450,000 inhabitants) encompasses only the central part of the metropolitan area of Rennes (750,000 inhabitants). Communes further away from the center of the metropolitan area have formed their own intercommunal structures, such as Châteaugiron, Noyal-sur-Vilaine, Liffré, Melesse, La Mézière, Montfort-sur-Meu or Guichen.

Gallery

References

Metropolis in France
Rennes